Allison Whitlock is an Australian born craft stylist, designer and owner of the homewares label homeMADEmodern. In 2005 Allison became the host of DIY Network's Uncommon Threads, a daily half-hour craft program. In 2006 the series was picked up for a second season and began airing on HGTV in 2007.

References

 Get Creative Magazine August 2007
 Get Creative Magazine September 2007
 Australian Quilters Companion October 2007

American television personalities
American women television personalities
Living people
Year of birth missing (living people)